The Korean Bell of Friendship (more commonly called Korean Friendship Bell) is a massive bronze bell housed in a stone pavilion in Angel's Gate Park, in the San Pedro neighborhood of Los Angeles, California. Located at the corner of Gaffey and 37th Streets, the section of the park is alternatively called the "Korean–American Peace Park" and occupies part of the former Upper Reservation of Fort MacArthur.

Description
It is modeled after the Divine Bell of King Seongdeok the Great of Silla (also known as the Emille Bell), cast in 771 for Bongdeok Temple and now located at the National Museum of Gyeongju. It was designated National Treasure of Korea number 29 in 1962. The Emille Bell is the largest bell ever cast in Korean history; both are among the largest bells in the world.

The bell is made of over seventeen tons of copper and tin, with gold, nickel, lead, and phosphorus added to the alloy for tone quality. The exterior surface is richly decorated in relief, featuring four pairs of figures. Each pair includes a "Goddess of Liberty" (bearing some resemblance to the Statue of Liberty) and a Seonnyeo, or Korean spirit figure, holding the South Korean national symbol: a Taegeuk symbol, a branch of rose of Sharon, a branch of laurel, and a dove.

History
The bell was presented by the South Korean government to the United States to celebrate the bicentennial of the U.S. and to symbolize friendship between the two countries. The effort was coordinated by Philip Ahn, a Korean American actor. It was dedicated on October 3, 1976, and declared Los Angeles Historic-Cultural Monument No. 187 on May 3, 1978.

The bell is struck 13 times on the first Saturday of each month at 11:30 AM.

Beginning in 2010, the bell has been ceremonially struck five times a year:
 Dec 31: New Year's Eve
 Jan 13: Korean American Day
 Jul 4: Fourth of July
 Aug 15: Korean Liberation Day
 Sep 17: Constitution Day

It was also rung on September 11, 2002, to commemorate the first anniversary of the September 11, 2001, terrorist attacks. The bell does not have a clapper; instead, it is sounded by striking it with a large wooden log.

The pavilion that houses the bell, known as the Belfry of Friendship, was built by South Korean craftsmen over a period of ten months. Its design is traditional. It is axially symmetric, consisting of a hipped (a.k.a. "pyramidal") roof supported by twelve columns representing the Korean zodiac, each column guarded by a carved animal. The color patterning along the bell's pavilion is known in Korean as dancheong.

In 2013, the bell received a full restoration to remove accumulated rust and graffiti tagging, and access to the bell and the pavilion was restricted from September through December.

Access to the Bell was closed for more than a year following the start of the COVID-19 pandemic in Los Angeles, reopening in May 2021.

Popular culture 
The Korean Friendship Bell is featured in films, television shows, and video games including:
 (1995) The Usual Suspects, as the location of the jewel exchange during the opening scenes.
 (2002) Bollywood movie Kaante shows one of the characters (Andy) walking with his kid in the park, with the belfry in background.
 (1996) American TV series Profiler features the bell and its pavilion in the Season 1 episode "Unholy Alliance."
 (2013) A similar pavilion is included in the "Little Seoul" area of Los Santos, a fictional recreation of Los Angeles for the game Grand Theft Auto V.
 (2015) Lana Del Rey used this location to film the music video for the song "Music to Watch Boys To" as has the South Korean rapper Zico.

See also

History of the Korean Americans in Los Angeles
 Koreatown, Los Angeles
 List of Los Angeles Historic-Cultural Monuments in the Harbor area

References

External links

 SanPedro.net:  Korean Bell of Friendship and Bell Pavilion – panoramic photograph and facts.
 Photo of the day for October 10, 2004 – ''photograph of U.S. and South Korean officials ringing the bell in Seoul on June 29, 1976; in "Stars and Stripes" newspaper.

Korean-American culture in Los Angeles
Individual bells in the United States
Korean art
Buildings and structures in Los Angeles
Los Angeles Historic-Cultural Monuments
San Pedro, Los Angeles
Buildings and structures completed in 1976